"The Bird" is a song from The Time's third album, Ice Cream Castle.  The song was initially recorded in the studio in 1983 with all instruments by Prince, except guitar, which was performed by Jesse Johnson. 
This version was replaced by a live recording with the full band at the First Avenue on October 4, 1983.  This is the first Time song to be released both live and featuring The Time as a band, rather than primarily Prince with Morris Day on vocals.
The song has become a signature number for the band and continues to be played in every Time concert to this day.  In addition, two additional live versions have since been released: one on Prince's Rave Un2 the Year 2000 DVD and one recorded at the House of Blues in 1998 for Morris Day's 2004 album It's About Time.

Background
The title of the upbeat number refers to a dance in which the arms are flapped, mimicking a bird's wings.  Morris Day also squawks throughout the song.  The song suggests that by "doing the bird", one can overcome their troubles.  "The Bird" is a funk-rock offering, using both a drum machine and live drumming by Jellybean Johnson.  Guitar takes the background for a funk effect, while keyboards play a dominant role in the song.  After the main lyrics, there is an extended instrumental section to allow the band to dance.  A "Dance Remix" of the song was released as a 12" single. The B-side to the single was the rocker, "My Drawers".

Chart history

In the media
 Used in the 1984 movie Purple Rain.
 Sampled on "The Latest Fashion" for the Graffiti Bridge album.
 Used as the initial WWF entrance theme for Koko B. Ware.
Shaquille O'Neal lip-synched this song on Inside the NBA.

References

The Time (band) songs
1984 singles
Songs written by Prince (musician)
Song recordings produced by Prince (musician)
1983 songs
Songs written by Jesse Johnson (musician)
Songs written by Morris Day
Warner Records singles